Žagar (or Zagar) is a leading band in Hungarian indie and electronic music. Their sound is based on contemporary electronic music, jazz and indie rock. The results are heavy beats, atmospheric mood and sound clips from the psychedelic era of the late 1960s. Andor Kovács and the leader of the band Balázs Zságer were the co-writers of the Yonderboi album Shallow and Profound in some track.

History
Their debut album was, Local Broadcast (UCMG/Ugar 2002), was selected for the chart of the 50 all-time most important Hungarian records by the music magazine WAN2. They made many soundtracks for short and feature films; the most important is Eastern Sugar (Fillcell/Universal 2004), which was the best soundtrack in 2005 in Hungary. Their music has been used in the US television series CSI: Crime Scene Investigation and its spin-off CSI: NY. The band released their second studio album, Cannot Walk Fly Instead (CLS Records), in September 2007 and 2009 worldwide on the German label, Mole Listening Pearls.

The band has been performing since 2001. They have played in Hungary, the UK, the Netherlands, Austria, Germany, Italy, Greece, Poland, Slovakia, Czech Republic and Russia. They supported Depeche Mode on the Budapest leg of the Tour of the Universe 2009. Its first single "Wings of Love", featuring the Underground Divas - six of Hungary's most popular independent singers - earned heavy radio airplay and secured a no1. spot on MTV's video chart. They earned numerous awards for this record, most notably the Hungarian Record Industry’s Fonogram Award and prize in the International Songwriting Competition. They were nominated for the Regional Award in the MTV European Music Awards 2008 and 2009.
Their tracks were remixed by Terry Lee Brown, Jr., Moonbotica, Eriq Johnson or Cottonmouth, among others.

Discography

Studio albums
Local Broadcast (2002)
Eastern Sugar (Soundtrack) (2004)
Cannot Walk Fly Instead (2007)
Light Leaks (2013)
Woods, Spirits & Sorcery (2019)

Singles
Wings of Love (2009)
Learn to Fall (2010)
Space Medusa (2012)

Remixes
Bosssa Astoria/Revolution Remixes (2003)
Wings of Love Remixes (2009)
Cannot Walk Fly Instead extended version (w. Wings of Love Remixes) (2009)
Prophet is a Fool Remixes (2011)
Never the Same Remixes (2012)

Music videos

Filmography

Members

Current band members
Balázs Zságer (rhodes piano, keys, electronica, programming)
Tibor Lázár (drums)
Ákos Zságer-Varga (bass)

Former band members
György Ligeti (vocals, guitars)
DJ Bootsie (scratch)
Andor Kovács (guitars)

Contributors
Edina Kutzora(vocal) (2002, 2004)
Underground Divas: Edina Kutzora, Sena, Németh Juci, Hodosi Enikő, Judie Jay, Péterfy Bori (vocal in Wings of Love song 2007)
Ferenczy Bukky(vocal) (2019)
Zsófia Hutvágner (Lyrics)

References

External links
 Official Žagar Site

Hungarian electronic musicians
Hungarian indie rock groups